Sogolon  is a town and sub-prefecture in the Télimélé Prefecture in the Kindia Region of western-central Guinea.

References

Sub-prefectures of the Kindia Region